The Roman Catholic Diocese of Kuzhithura is a diocese located in Tamil Nadu. It was erected on 22 December 2014 by Pope Francis with territory taken from the Diocese of Kottar. He appointed Fr. Jerome Dhas Varuvel as the first bishop of the diocese.

Due to health reasons Bishop Jerome submitted his resignation to Pope Francis which was accepted on 6 June 2020. Simultaneously, Pope Francis appointed the Metropolitan Archbishop of Madurai, Antony Pappusamy, as Apostolic Administrator of the diocese of Kuzhithura.

Bifurcation of the diocese of Kottar had been a long-standing demand of the people of the region. 100 Parishes from Thiruthuvapuram and Mulagumoodu vicariates of Kottar diocese were put under the administrative control of Kuzhithurai diocese. Prior to this bifurcation, Kottar diocese had been one of the largest in India with over 500000 Catholics.

Churches
KARENKADU (1778) : Church of St. Aloysius Gonzaga
MULAGUMOODU (1860) : Church of Our Lady of Nativity 
MANKUZHY (1906) : Church of St. Francis Xavier
MATHIRAVILAI  (1906) : Church of Our Lady of Assumption 
PUTHENKADAI (1908) : Church of St. James
MULLANGANAVILAI (1912) : Church of St. Antony
MANALIKARAI (1913) : Church of St. Joseph
MADATHATTUVLIAI (1918) : Church of St. Sebastian
PUTHUKADAI (1920) : Church of Our Lady of Assumption
THIRITHUVAPURAM (1920) : Church of the Most Holy Trinity
VAVARAI (1924) : Church of Our Lady of Mt. Carmel
CHERUVALLOOR (1930) : Church of St. Michael Archangel
KULASEKHARAM (1931) : Church of St. Augustine
PALLIYADY (1931) : Church of the Sacred Heart of Jesus
PACKIAPURAM (1936) : Church of St. Eusthachius
SILUVAIPURAM (1936) : Church of St.John of the Cross
CHEMPARUTHIVILAI (1939) : Church of St. Antony of Padua
KANDANVILAI (1944) : Church of St. Therese of Child Jesus
VENCODE (1949) : Church of St. Francis Xavier
KADAYAL (1952) : Church of the Sacred Heart of Jesus
KALKURICHY (1954) : Church of St.Joseph
KAPPUKAD (1955) : Church of St. Antony
POOTTETTY (1956) : Church of St. Antony of Padua
AMSI (1958) : Church of the Imm. Heart of Mary
PACODE (1959) : Church of the Sacred Heart
MADHAPURAM (1997) : Our Lady of Presentation Church, Mathapuram

Mulagumoodu Vicariate Parishes 
KARENKADU (1778) : Church of St. Aloysius Gonzaga
MULAGUMOODU (1860) : Church of Our Lady of Nativity 
MANKUZHY (1906) : Church of St. Francis Xavier
MATHIRAVILAI  (1906) : Church of Our Lady of Assumption 
MULLANGANAVILAI (1912) : Church of St. Antony
MANALIKARAI (1913) : Church of St. Joseph
MADATHATTUVLIAI (1918) : Church of St. Sebastian
PALLIYADY (1931) : Church of the Sacred Heart of Jesus
CHEMPARUTHIVILAI (1939) : Church of St. Antony of Padua
KANDANVILAI (1944) : Church of St. Therese of Child Jesus
KALKURICHY (1954) : Church of St.Joseph
MURASANCODE (1963) : Church of O.L. of Mt. Carmel 
KONAMKADU (1966) : Church of St. Francis Xavier
KAPPIARAI (1966) : Church of St. Catherine
THUNDATHHUVILAI  (1966) : Church of St. Antony
ALANVILAI (1968) : Church of Our Lady of  Lourdes
VELLICODE (1968) : Church of Our Lady of Sorrows
MYLACODE (1971) : Church of Our Lady of Mt. Carmel 
THUCKALAY (1972) : Church of St. Elias
KANJIRACODE (1975) : Church of Our Lady of Rosary 
PATTARIVILAI  (1979) : Church of Our Lady of Snows
KUTTAIKADU (1984) : Church of St.Jude Thadeus
MULAVILAI (1984) : Church of Christ the King
SAHAYA NAGAR (1986) : Church of O.L. of Perpetual Succour
VELLIAVILAI (1996) : Church of Good Shepherd
KOZHIPORVILAI (1997) : Church of St. Michael 
APPATTUVILAI  (1999) : Church of St.Joseph    
SOLAPURAM  (1999) : Church of St.Pius X
MANALI (2000) : Church of St. Antony
PANAVILAI (2000) : Church of the Holy Redeemer
KOOTTAMAVU (2001) : Church of O. L. of Perpetual Succour
THIRUVITHANCODE (2004) : Church of the Ascension of O.Lord
AROCKIAPURAM (2006) : Church of St. Roch
KALLUKOOTTAM (2008) : Church of Our Lady of Fatima
MANALIKUZHIVILAI (2008) : Church of St. Michael the Archangel
KONNAKUZHIVILAI (2008) : Church of Our Lady of Sorrows
MUTTAICADU (29.11.2009) : Church of St. Francis Xavier
PILAVIALI  (04.05.2010) : Church of St. George
CHETTICHARVILAI (09.05.2010) : Church of Little Flower
CHERUKOL karumputhottam (16.05.2010) : Church of St. Antony
VALVACHAGOSTAM (24.05.2010) : Church of St. Antony 
KUZHIVILAI (2011) : Church of St. Francis Xavier
MUKKALAMPADU (2011) : Church of Our Lady of Sorrows
APPATTUVILAI  (22.06.2011) : Church of St. Antony
KALLARAVILAI (26.06.2011) : Church of Our Lady of Fatima
VATTAM (2012) : Church of St. Antony
NULLIVILAI (26.05.2013) : Church of Our Lady of Lourdes
VARTHANVILAI (01.11.2014) : Church of St. Antony
IRUDAYAPURAM (03.11.2014) : Church of the Sacred Heart of Jesus
CHIRANKUZHI               : Church of St. Micheal
MANCHADI                  : Church of St. Joseph

Thiruthuvapuram Vicariate Parishes 
PUTHENKADAI (1908) : Church of St. James
THIRITHUVAPURAM (1920) : Church of the Most Holy Trinity
PUTHUKADAI (1920) : Church of Our Lady of Assumption
VAVARAI (1924) : Church of Our Lady of Mt. Carmel
CHERUVALLOOR (1930) : Church of St. Michael Archangel
KULASEKHARAM (1931) : Church of St. Augustine
PACKIAPURAM (1936) : Church of ST. EUSTACHIUS
SILUVAIPURAM (1936) : Church of St.John of the Cross
VENCODE (1949) : Church of St. Francis Xavier
KADAYAL (1952) : Church of the Sacred Heart of Jesus
KAPPUKAD (1955) : Church of St. Antony
POOTTETTY (1956) : Church of St. Antony of Padua
AMSI (1958) : Church of the Imm. Heart of Mary
PACODE (1959) : Church of the Sacred Heart
MELPURAM (1967) : Church of the Holy Guardian Angel
PARAKUNNU (1968) : Church of the S.H. of Jesus
MELPALAI (1971) : Church of Our Lady of Assumption
ELAVUVILAI (1972) : Church of St. Aloysius
KANJAMPURAM (1972) : Church of St. Therese of Child Jesus
KALIAKKAVILAI (1973) : Church of St. Antony
KOLVEL (1973) : Church of O.L.of Mt. Carmel
LOURDUGIRI (1975) : Church of Our Lady of Lourdes
MARTHANDAM (1979) : Church of St. Francis Xavier
NALLAYANPURAM (1979) : Church of Good Shepherd
VIZHUNTHAYAMBALAM (1984) : Church of St. Antony
THEMANOOR (1989) : Church of O.L. of Assumption
ATTOOR (1991) : Church of St. Andrew
CHOOZHAL (1991) : Church of St.Michael Archangel
NAGACODE (1995) : Church of St. Antony
MARUTHANCODE(1997) : Church of St. Antony
PECHIPPARAI (1998) : Church of St. Joseph
MUNCHIRAI (2000) : Church of Our Lady of Good Health
KOTTOORKONAM (2001) : Church of Infant Jesus
THUMBALI (2001) : Church of the Imm. Heart of Mary
IRUTHAYAPURAM (2002) : Church of Christ the King
ITHAYAPURAM (2005) : Church of the Sacred Heart
MANCHAKONAM (2006) : Church of St. Therese of Child Jesus
KAMPLAR (2008) : Church of St. Joseph
PULLANI (2008) : Church of St. Antony
ALANCHOLAI (14.05.2009) : Church of Our Lady of Lourdes
MATHOOR (06.11.2009) : Church of St. Joseph
AMBALAKADAI (09.11.2009) : Church of SS Peter & Paul
EANCHACODE (12.11.2009) : Church of Our Lady of Per. Help
PALAVILAI (14.05.2010) : Church of St. Antony
YETTACODE (17.05.2010) : Church of St. Francis Xavier
FATIMAPURAM (11.02.2012) : Church of Our Lady of Fatima
VANNIYOOR (07.03.2012) : Church of St. Joseph
CHENTHARAI (20.08.2013) : Church of St. Francis Xavier
THICKURICHY (04.11.2013) : Church of St. Gabriel
VELLAYAMBALAM ( 31.10.2014) : Church of St. Antony
KUZHITHURAI (05.11.2014) : Church of St.Michael the Archangel

Schools
St. Francis Hr. Sec. School, Vavarai, S.T. Mangad 629 172
St. Francis Hr. Sec. School, Vencode  629 171
St. Joseph’s Hr. Sec. School, Mulagumoodu  629 167
St. Joseph’s Hr. Sec. School, Thirithuvapuram, Kuzhithurai 629 163
St. Mary’s Hr. Sec. School, Melpalai  629 152
St. Joseph's Hr. Sec. School, Vizhunthayambalam, Thengapattanam 629 173
Amala Convent Hr. Sec. School, Thuckalay  629 175
St. Aloysius Hr. Sec. School, Velliavilai, Palapallam  629 159
St. Antony's Hr. Sec. School, Enayam Puthenthurai, Keezhkulam  629 193
St. Maria Goretti Hr. Sec. School, Manalikarai 629 164
St. Aloysius High School, Elavuvilai 629 171
St. Antony's High School, Kappukad  629 162
St. Joseph's High School, Siluvaipuram, Kollencode 629 160
Carmel Girls High School, Manalikarai 629 174
Infant Jesus Girls High School, Mulagumoodu  629 167
St. Antony's High School, Mullanganavilai  629 157
St. John Vianney's Girls High School, Palliady 629 169
St. Lawrence Higher Secondary School. Madathattuvilai
Sacret Heart High School, Pacode  629 168
St.Antony High School, Chemparuthivilai 629 166
St. Anthony's high school thundaththuvilai, karungal
Nanjil Catholic School, Vazhuthalampallam (CBSE)

See also
Catholic Church in India

References

External links
 GCatholic.org
 Catholic Hierarchy 
 குழித்துறை மறைமாவட்டம்
 Vatican Official Communication 

Roman Catholic dioceses in India
Christianity in Tamil Nadu
Christian organizations established in 2014
Roman Catholic dioceses and prelatures established in the 21st century
2014 establishments in Tamil Nadu